Maria Uhden  (1892 - 1918) was a German painter and printmaker.

Biography
Uhden was born on 6 March 1892 in Coburg, Germany. She was part of the German Expressionist movement.  She was married to fellow painter Georg Schrimpf. She died on 14 August 1918 in Munich.

Her work is in the collection of the Los Angeles County Museum of Art, the  Metropolitan Museum of Art, the Museum of Modern Art, the National Gallery of Art, and the Fine Arts Museums of San Francisco

Gallery

References

External links

  
1892 births
1918 deaths 
People from Coburg
20th-century German women artists
19th-century German women artists